Calamochrous is a genus of moths of the family Crambidae.

Species
Calamochrous chilonalis Lederer, 1863
Calamochrous brevipalpis Snellen, 1890
Calamochrous carnealis (Swinhoe, 1895)
Calamochrous ferruginalis Hampson, 1896
Calamochrous pallidalis Hampson, 1900
Calamochrous albipunctalis Kenrick, 1907
Calamochrous homochroalis Swinhoe, 1907
Calamochrous purpuralis Hampson, 1908
Calamochrous sarcalis Hampson, 1908
Calamochrous fulvitinctalis Hampson, 1918
Calamochrous minimalis Caradja, 1931

References

Pyraustinae
Crambidae genera
Taxa named by Julius Lederer